Wölfersheim is a municipality in the Wetteraukreis in Hessen, Germany. It is located approximately 34 kilometers north of Frankfurt am Main.

Division of the municipality
The municipality consists of 5 districts:
 Wölfersheim
 Södel
 Melbach
 Berstadt
 Wohnbach

Holocaust
There was a small Jewish community in Wölfersheim since at least 1700. On Kristallnacht, the night of broken glass, the Jews of the town were brutally attacked by thugs. Their legal documents were destroyed and some were sent to the concentration camps where they were murdered by the Nazis. The Jewish cemetery still stands today though there are no Jews left in the town.

References

External links
 

Wetteraukreis
Holocaust locations in Germany